The 2009 Malaysian motorcycle Grand Prix was the sixteenth round of the 2009 Grand Prix motorcycle racing season. It took place on the weekend of 23–25 October 2009 at the Sepang International Circuit. In wet conditions the race was dominated by Casey Stoner in a return to form following a mystery illness which ended his hopes of regaining the world championship title. Valentino Rossi finished third, which clinched the 2009 MotoGP championship for him.

MotoGP classification

250 cc classification

125 cc classification

Notes

Championship standings after the race (MotoGP)
Below are the standings for the top five riders and constructors after round sixteen has concluded.

Riders' Championship standings

Constructors' Championship standings

 Note: Only the top five positions are included for both sets of standings.

References

Malaysian motorcycle Grand Prix
Malaysia
Motorcycle Grand Prix